Hand and foot deformity with flat facies is a rare congenital malformation syndrome, where an individual has features such as facial dysmorphism, short stature, and other malformations with the limbs.

Individuals with the condition can also have mental retardation, flat face, coarse hair, or camptodactyly.

This disorder is present at birth but isn't diagnosed until middle childhood.

The syndrome was first described by Alan E. H. Emery and Matilda M. Nelson of the University of Edinburgh in 1970. There have been no further reports in the literature since 1970.

References 

Rare genetic syndromes
Syndromes with short stature